The Otavi Mining and Railway Company (Otavi Minen- und Eisenbahn-Gesellschaft or OMEG) was a railway and mining company in German South West Africa (today's Namibia). It was founded on 6 April 1900 in Berlin with the Disconto-Gesellschaft and the South West Africa Company as major shareholders.

Construction

OMEG built a  narrow gauge railway extending  from Swakopmund on the Atlantic coast to the mines of Tsumeb. Construction began in 1903 and reached Tsumeb three years later. The first  of railway required 110 steel bridges to cross deeply eroded gullies through sparsely vegetated arid terrain. Most were deck plate girders. The railway, known as the Otavibahn, was the longest  gauge railway in the world at its time of construction.

Construction coincided with the Herero and Namaqua Genocide. Delays resulted from labor shortages and military heeresfeldbahn operations. A 91-kilometer branch was completed in 1908 from Otavi to mines near Grootfontein.

During World War I, German troops had moved inland by the time South African troops reached Swakopmund in January, 1915. German forces destroyed the railroad as they retreated, and South African forces reconstructed a  narrow gauge line over the route to Karabib in 1915.
German troops surrendered following defeat at Otavi in July, 1915; and service was re-established over the remaining  narrow gauge line from the railway shops at Usakos with freight transfer facilities at Karabib.

Nationalization and conversion to Cape gauge
The Otavi line was nationalized in 1923. Train service was interrupted by a locust infestation in 1924 until steam nozzles were installed on locomotives to sweep the insects off the rails before their crushed bodies could reduce traction under the locomotive wheels. The worst flooding in forty years caused extensive washouts in 1925.

The Tsumeb mines closed in 1933. German rearmament activity reopened the mines from 1936 until the South African government closed the mine as enemy property in 1940. Tsumeb mines reopened again in 1946. The remainder of the line was regauged to  narrow gauge in 1961 and became part of the TransNamib.

Rolling stock 
The first locomotives designed for regular service were fifteen  0-6-2T built by Arn. Jung. Henschel & Sohn built twelve locomotives similar to the Jung design and three 0-6-0T. Henschel & Sohn built three HD class 2-8-2 in 1912 with separate 8-wheel tenders for long-distance running.

By 1913, train service included 4 express trains, 14 mixed trains, and 29 freight trains each week. Express and mixed trains included a baggage car, a car for African passengers, and a coach for first and second class passengers. The passenger cars carried concrete ballast in a depressed center section to minimize the possibility of wind tipping a lightly loaded car off the rails. Express trains stopped only at designated stations, but other trains would stop at intermediate points when transport was required. Equipment included:
 96 low-side ore gondolas
 55 high-side gondolas
 20 limestone gondolas
 20 boxcars
 12 tank cars
 4 stock cars
 3 passenger coaches
 An executive business car with a kitchen, a bathroom, and an office convertible to a bedroom at night. There were also some self-powered steam rail cars with a coal bunker, a mail compartment, 2 compartments for Europeans, and 4 for Africans.

A special  rail motor coach was built for an anticipated visit of Kronprinz Wilhelm in 1914. World War I intervened to prevent Wilhelm's visit, and the car was used as an inspection vehicle after the war.

Two Henschel & Sohn 4-6-2 locomotives built in 1914 had disappeared during the war; but Baldwin Locomotive Works delivered a 4-6-2 in 1916. A coach converted for meal service from 1916 to 1931 is believed to be the only  gauge dining car ever operated.

Six more Henschel & Sohn 2-8-2 were delivered in 1922. These locomotives were designated South African Railways (SAR) NG5 class. Three SAR NGG 13 Class 2-6-2+2-6-2 Garratt locomotives were used from 1927 until 1933. Henschel & Sohn delivered three SAR NG15 Class 2-8-2 locomotives in 1931. Four sleeping cars were built for the railroad in 1938; when Henschel & Sohn delivered three more 2-8-2 SAR NG15 Class. Fifteen more SAR NG15 Class 2-8-2 locomotives were delivered as three groups of five in 1949, 1952, and 1957. Purchase of additional Garratt locomotives was briefly considered in 1958 but cancelled due to the upcoming track gauge conversion to  narrow gauge.

See also 
 Slippery rail
 South African Class NG 15 2-8-2
 Swakopmund–Windhoek line
 Two foot gauge railways in South Africa
 Mansfeld Mining Railway: a copper ore railway in Germany
 White Knob Copper Electric Railway: a copper ore railway in the United States
 BHP Nevada Railroad: a copper ore railway in the United States

Notes

References

External links 
 

German South West Africa
Railway companies of Namibia
Mining railways
Mining in Namibia
Swakopmund
Tsumeb
600 mm gauge railways in Namibia
Non-renewable resource companies established in 1900
1900 establishments in German South West Africa
Copper mining